Bennu  is an ancient Egyptian deity linked with the Sun, creation, and rebirth. He may have been the original inspiration for the phoenix legends that developed in Greek mythology.

Roles

According to Egyptian mythology, Bennu was a self-created being said to have played a role in the creation of the world. He was said to be the ba of Ra and to have enabled the creative actions of Atum. The deity was said to have flown over the waters of Nun that existed before creation, landing on a rock and issuing a call that determined the nature of creation. He also was a symbol of rebirth and, therefore, was associated with Osiris.

Some of the titles of Bennu were "He Who Came Into Being by Himself", and "Lord of Jubilees"; the latter epithet referred to the belief that Bennu periodically renewed himself like the sun was thought to do. His name is related to the Egyptian verb wbn, meaning "to rise in brilliance" or "to shine".

Depiction

The Pyramid Texts, which date to the Old Kingdom, refer to the 'bnw' as a symbol of Atum, and it may have been the original form of Bennu. In this word the shape of a bird is used that is definitely not a heron, but a small singing bird. The old 'Woerterbuch der Aegyptische Sprache' surmised that this small singing bird might have been a Yellow Wagtail ('Motacilla flava', but no clear reason is given.  However, the same bird used in the spelling of a word 'bn.t' in a painted limestone relief wall fragment from the suntemple of the Vth Dynasty king Niuserre from the Old Kingdom, now in the Aegypisches Museum at Berlin (inv.nr. Aeg.Mus. 20038-20039), clearly shows traces of blue-grey paint on much of the body of this bird-sign, so that a different bird species was definitely meant. Shape and colour seem to point rather to a (Mediterranean) Kingfisher (Alcedo atthis) for whom, however, another name was in use: 'hn.t<y'= lit. 'the one of the canal'. Traces of orange(brown)colouring existing on and also outside the chiseled glyph did originally not belong to this particular bird sign. They are caused by natural stains in the white limestone, as the higher lying layer of blue paint on the bird shows as well. The advantage of such bird identification might be, that a Kingfisher flying lowly over watery surfaces and shrieking loudly would be a reasonable mythical example for the creator deity Atum of Heliopolis as having risen from the first dark waters, called Nun, in order to start his creation of the world. If so, this Kingfisher 'bnw' or 'bn.t' is a good match for the mythical and cultic Nile goose (Eg. 'smn') of the creator deity Amun in later periods, imagined to having been honking loudly in the primeval dark above the still waters in order to bring forth all creation by its voice. 

New Kingdom artwork shows Bennu as a huge grey heron with a long beak and a two-feathered crest. Sometimes Bennu is depicted as perched on a benben stone (representing Ra and the name of the top stone of a pyramid) or in a willow tree (representing Osiris). Because of the connection with Osiris, Bennu sometimes wears the Atef crown, instead of the solar disk.

Possible animal model
In comparatively recent times, a large species of heron, now extinct, lived on the Arabian Peninsula. It shares many characteristics with Bennu. It may have been the animal after which Bennu was modeled by the ancient Egyptians during the New Kingdom.

Worship

Like Atum and Ra, the Bennu was probably worshipped in their cult center at Heliopolis. The deity also appears on funerary scarab amulets as a symbol of rebirth.

Connection with the Greek phoenix
The Greek historian Herodotus, writing about Egyptian customs and traditions in the fifth century BC, wrote that the people at Heliopolis described the "phoenix" to him. They said it lived for 500 years before dying, resuscitating, building a funerary egg with myrrh for the paternal corpse, and carrying it to the temple of the Sun at Heliopolis. His description of the phoenix likens it to an eagle with red and gold plumage, reminiscent of the sun. 

Long after Herodotus, the theme ultimately associated with the Greek phoenix, with the fire, pyre, and ashes of the dying bird developed in Greek traditions. 

The name, "phoenix", could be derived from "Bennu" and its rebirth and connections with the sun resemble the beliefs about Bennu, however, Egyptian sources do not mention a death of the deity.

Chosen as scientific name of the bird
Remains of a giant, human-sized heron species, thought to have gone extinct around 1500 BC, have been discovered in the United Arab Emirates. That species may have been the animal model for the deity, Bennu, so archaeologist Dr. Ella Hoch from the Geological Museum at Copenhagen University named it the Bennu heron (Ardea bennuides).

See also
 Fenghuang
 Firebird (Slavic folklore)
 Vermilion Bird

References

Further reading
 
 Lecocq, Françoise (2016). "Inventing the Phoenix: A Myth in the making Through Words and Images". In Johnston, Patricia A.; Mastrocinque, Attilio; Papaioannou, Sophia. Animals in Greek and Roman Religion and Myth. Cambridge Scholars Publishing, pp. 449–478.
 Lecocq, Françoise (2019). "L'oiseau bénou-phénix et son tertre sur la tunique historiée de Saqqâra. Une interprétation nouvelle" , ENiM (Égypte nilotique et méditerranéenne) 12, 2019, pp. 247–280.

External links
 

Egyptian legendary creatures
Egyptian hieroglyphs: birds
Legendary birds
Phoenix birds